In reproductive biology, a hermaphrodite is an organism that has both kinds of reproductive organs and can produce both gametes associated with male and female sexes.

Many taxonomic groups of animals (mostly invertebrates) do not have separate sexes. In these groups, hermaphroditism is a normal condition, enabling a form of sexual reproduction in which either partner can act as the female or male. For example, the great majority of tunicates, pulmonate molluscs, opisthobranch, earthworms, and slugs are hermaphrodites. Hermaphroditism is also found in some fish species and to a lesser degree in other vertebrates. Most plants are also hermaphrodites. Animal species having different sexes, male and female, are called gonochoric, which is the opposite of hermaphrodite.

There are also species where hermaphrodites exist alongside males (called androdioecy) or alongside females (called gynodioecy), or all three exist in the same  species (called trioecy); these three systems are sometimes called mixed breeding systems. In plants there are cases where male flowers and hermaphrodite flowers occur on the same plant (andromonoecy) or female flowers and hermaphrodite flowers on the same plant (gynomonoecy).

The term hermaphrodite is commonly used for abnormal cases of dioecious animal species but according to geneticist Michael Majerus this definition should be distinguished from the scientific definition.

In recent years the term hermaphrodite applied to humans has fallen out of favor since there have been no identified cases of a human reproducing as both male and female, with some biologists saying hermaphroditism does not occur in humans. Intersex activists have preferred the word intersex, since the word hermaphrodite is considered to be stigmatizing, as well as "scientifically specious and clinically problematic."

There are no hermaphroditic species among mammals or birds. According to David B. Rivers there is controversy around hermaphroditism in insects with some experts believing it does not occur. Hermaphroditism is said to occur in one or two insect species.

A rough estimate of the number of hermaphroditic animal species is 65,000. The percentage of animal species that are hermaphroditic is about 5% in all animal species, or 33% excluding insects. (Although the current estimated total number of animal species is about 7.7 million, the study, which estimated the number, 65,000, used an estimated total number of animal species, 1,211,577 from "Classification phylogénétique du vivant (Vol. 2)" - Lecointre and Le Guyader (2001)). Most hermaphroditic species exhibit some degree of self-fertilization. The distribution of self-fertilization rates among animals is similar to that of plants, suggesting that similar pressures are operating to direct the evolution of selfing in animals and plants.

Etymology
According to Ovid, he fused with the nymph Salmacis resulting in one individual possessing physical traits of male and female sexes; according to the earlier Diodorus Siculus, he was born with a physical body combining male and female sexes. The word hermaphrodite entered the English lexicon as early as the late fourteenth century. Alexander ab Alexandro stated, using the term hermaphrodite, that the people who bore the sexes of both man and woman were regarded by the Athenians and the Romans as monsters, and thrown into the sea at Athens and into the Tiber at Rome.

Animals

Sequential hermaphrodites

Sequential hermaphrodites (dichogamy) occur in species in which the individual is born as one sex, but can later change into the opposite sex. This contrasts simultaneous hermaphrodites, in which an individual may possess fully functional male and female genitalia. Sequential hermaphroditism is common in fish (particularly teleost fish) and many gastropods (such as the common slipper shell), and some flowering plants. Sequential hermaphrodites can only change sex once. Sequential hermaphroditism can best be understood in terms of behavioral ecology and evolutionary life history theory, as described in the size-advantage mode first proposed by Michael T. Ghiselin which states that if an individual of a certain sex could significantly increase its reproductive success after reaching a certain size, it would be to their advantage to switch to that sex.

Sequential hermaphrodites can be divided into three broad categories:
 Protandry: Where an organism is born as a male, and then changes sex to a female.
 Example: The clownfish (genus Amphiprion) are colorful reef fish found living in symbiosis with sea anemones. Generally one anemone contains a 'harem', consisting of a large female, a smaller reproductive male, and even smaller non-reproductive males. If the female is removed, the reproductive male will change sex and the largest of the non-reproductive males will mature and become reproductive. It has been shown that fishing pressure can change when the switch from male to female occurs, since fishermen usually prefer to catch the larger fish. The populations are generally changing sex at a smaller size, due to natural selection.
 Protogyny: Where the organism is born as a female, and then changes sex to a male.
 Example: Wrasses (Family Labridae) are a group of reef fish in which protogyny is common. Wrasses also have an uncommon life history strategy, which is termed diandry (literally, two males). In these species, two male morphs exists: an initial phase male and a terminal phase male. Initial phase males do not look like males and spawn in groups with females. They are not territorial. They are, perhaps, female mimics (which is why they are found swimming in group with females). Terminal phase males are territorial and have a distinctively bright coloration. Individuals are born as males or females, but if they are born males, they are not born as terminal phase males. Females and initial phase males can become terminal phase males. Usually, the most dominant female or initial phase male replaces any terminal phase male when those males die or abandon the group.
Bidirectional sex changers: Where an organism has female and male reproductive organs, but act as either female or male during different stages in life.
Example: Lythrypnus dalli (Family Lythrypnus) are a group of coral reef fish in which bidirectional sex change occurs. Once a social hierarchy is established a fish changes sex according to its social status, regardless of the initial sex, based on a simple principle: if the fish expresses subordinate behavior then it changes its sex to female, and if the fish expresses dominant or not subordinate behavior then the fish changes its sex to male.
Dichogamy can have both conservation-related implications for humans, as mentioned above, as well as economic implications. For instance, groupers are favoured fish for eating in many Asian countries and are often aquacultured. Since the adults take several years to change from female to male, the broodstock are extremely valuable individuals.

Simultaneous hermaphrodites

A simultaneous (or synchronous) hermaphrodite (or homogamous) is an adult organism that has both male and female sexual organs at the same time. Simultaneous hermaphrodites can be regarded as both sexes present in the same individual. Self-fertilization often occurs.
 Reproductive system of gastropods: Pulmonate land snails and land slugs are perhaps the best-known kind of simultaneous hermaphrodite, and are the most widespread of terrestrial animals possessing this sexual polymorphism. Sexual material is exchanged between both animals via spermatophore, which can then be stored in the spermatheca. After exchange of spermatozoa, both animals will lay fertilized eggs after a period of gestation; then the eggs will proceed to hatch after a development period. Snails typically reproduce from early spring through late autumn.
:Banana slugs are another example of a hermaphroditic gastropod. Mating with a partner is more desirable biologically, as the genetic material of the resultant offspring is varied, but if mating with a partner is not possible, self-fertilization is practiced. The male sexual organ of an adult banana slug is quite large in proportion to its size, as well as compared to the female organ. It is possible for banana slugs, while mating, to become stuck together. If a substantial amount of wiggling fails to separate them, the male organ will be bitten off (using the slug's radula), see apophallation. If a banana slug has lost its male sexual organ, it can still mate as a female, making its hermaphroditic quality a valuable adaptation.
 The species of colourful sea slugs Goniobranchus reticulatus is hermaphroditic, with both male and female organs active at the same time during copulation.  After mating, the external portion of the penis detaches, but is able to regrow within 24 hours.
 Hamlets, unlike other fish, seem quite at ease mating in front of divers, allowing observations in the wild to occur readily. They do not practice self-fertilization, but when they find a mate, the pair takes turns between which one acts as the male and which acts as the female through multiple matings, usually over the course of several nights.
 Earthworms are another example of a simultaneous hermaphrodite. Although they possess ovaries and testes, they have a protective mechanism against self-fertilization. Sexual reproduction occurs when two worms meet and exchange gametes, copulating on damp nights during warm seasons. Fertilized eggs are protected by a cocoon, which is buried on or near the surface of the ground.
 The free-living hermaphroditic nematode Caenorhabditis elegans reproduces primarily by self-fertilization, but infrequent out-crossing events occur at a rate of approximately 1%.
 The mangrove killifish (Kryptolebias marmoratus) is a species of fish that lives along the east coast of North, Central and South America. These fish are simultaneous hermaphrodites. K. marmoratus produces eggs and sperm by meiosis and routinely reproduces by self-fertilization. Each individual hermaphrodite normally fertilizes itself when an egg and sperm produced by an internal organ unite inside the fish's body. This species is also regarded as the only known vertebrate species that can reproduce by self fertilization.

Pseudohermaphroditism

When spotted hyenas were first scientifically observed by explorers, they were thought to be hermaphrodites. Early observations of spotted hyenas in the wild led researchers to believe that all spotted hyenas, male and female, were born with what appeared to be a penis. The apparent penis in female spotted hyenas is in fact an enlarged clitoris, which contains an external birth canal. It can be difficult to determine the sex of wild spotted hyenas until sexual maturity, when they may become pregnant. When a female spotted hyena gives birth, they pass the cub through the cervix internally, but then pass it out through the elongated clitoris.

Plants

Hermaphrodite is used in botany to describe, for example, a flower that has both staminate (male, pollen-producing) and carpellate (female, ovule-producing) parts.

Monoecy 
Flowering plant species with separate male and female flowers on the same individual are called monoecious. Monoecious plants are often referred to as hermaphroditic because they produce both male and female gametes. However, the individual flowers are not hermaphroditic because they are only one sex. Monoecy only occurs in about 7% of angiosperm species. Conifers are almost all monoecious, but 65% of gymnosperm species are dioecious. Some plants can change their sex throughout their lifetime. This process is called Sequential hermaphroditism.

Andromonecy 
In andromonecious species, the plants produce perfect (hermaphrodite) flowers and separate staminate flowers that function as male but are sterile as female. Andromonecy occurs in about 4000 species of flowering plants (2% of flowering plants).

Use regarding humans

Historically, the term hermaphrodite was used in law to refer to people whose sex was in doubt. The 12th-century Decretum Gratiani states that "Whether an hermaphrodite may witness a testament, depends on which sex prevails" ("Hermafroditus an ad testamentum adhiberi possit, qualitas sexus incalescentis ostendit."). Similarly, the 17th-century English jurist and judge Edward Coke (Lord Coke), wrote in his Institutes of the Lawes of England on laws of succession stating, "Every heire is either a male, a female, or an hermaphrodite, that is both male and female. And an hermaphrodite (which is also called Androgynus) shall be heire, either as male or female, according to that kind of sexe which doth prevaile."

During the Victorian era, medical authors attempted to ascertain whether or not humans could be hermaphrodites, adopting a precise biological definition to the term. From that period until the early 21st century, intersex individuals were termed true hermaphrodites if their gonadal tissue contained both testicular and ovarian tissue, or pseudohermaphrodites if their external appearance (phenotype) differed from sex expected from internal gonads. This language has fallen out of favor due to misconceptions and pejorative connotations associated with the terms, and also a shift to nomenclature based on genetics.

The term intersex describes a wide variety of combinations of what are considered male and female biological characteristics. Intersex biology may include, for example, ambiguous-looking external genitalia, karyotypes that include mixed XX and XY chromosome pairs (46XX/46XY, 46XX/47XXY or 45X/XY mosaic). Clinically, medicine currently describes intersex people as having disorders of sex development, a term vigorously contested. This is particularly because of a relationship between medical terminology and medical intervention.

Intersex civil society organizations, and many human rights institutions, have criticized medical interventions designed to make intersex bodies more typically male or female.

In some cases, intersex traits are caused by unusual levels of sex hormones, which may be the result of an atypical set of sex chromosomes. One possible pathophysiological explanation of intersex in humans is a parthenogenetic division of a haploid ovum into two haploid ova. Upon fertilization of the two ova by two sperm cells (one carrying an X chromosome and the other carrying a Y chromosome), the two fertilized ova are then fused together resulting in a person having dual genitalial, gonadal (ovotestes) and genetic sex. Another common cause of being intersex is the crossing over of the testis-determining factor (SRY) from the Y chromosome to the X chromosome during meiosis. The SRY is then activated in only certain areas, causing development of testes in some areas by beginning a series of events starting with the upregulation of the transcription factor (SOX9), and in other areas not being active (causing the growth of ovarian tissues). Thus, testicular and ovarian tissues will both be present in the same individual.

Fetuses before sexual differentiation are sometimes described as female by doctors explaining the process. This is not technically true. Before this stage, humans are simply undifferentiated and possess a paramesonephric duct, a mesonephric duct, and a genital tubercle.

Evolution 

The evolution of anisogamy may have contributed to the evolution of simultaneous hermaphroditism and sequential hermaphroditism but, as of 2016 it remains unclear if the evolution of anisogamy first led to hermaphroditism or gonochorism. It is possible that hermaphroditism evolved from gonochorism, or vice versa. Most studies on its evolution focus on plants, and its evolution in animals is unclear .

Simultaneous hermaphroditism that exclusively reproduces through self-fertilization has evolved many times in plants and animals, but it might not last long evolutionarily.

In animals 
Joan Roughgarden and Priya Iyer argued that the last common ancestor for animals was hermaphroditic and that transitions from hermaphroditism to gonochorism were more numerous than the reverse. However, their argument was based on paraphyletic Spiralia, assignments of sexual modes for the phylum level than the species level, and methods exclusively based on maximum parsimony.

Hermaphroditism is polyphyletic in invertebrates where it evolved from gonochorism and gonochorism is also ancestral to hermaphroditic fishes. According to Nelson Çabej simultaneous hermaphroditism in animals most likely evolved due to a limited number of mating partners.

In plants 

It is widely accepted that the first vascular plants were outcrossing hermaphrodites. In flowering plants, hermaphroditism is ancestral to dioecy. Flowers in angiosperms evolved to attract insects as vectors for pollination.

Hermaphroditism in plants may promote self fertilization in pioneer populations. However, plants have evolved multiple different mechanisms to avoid self-fertilization in hermaphrodites, including sequential hermaphroditism, molecular recognition systems and mechanical or morphological mechanisms such as heterostyly.

See also 

 Asexual reproduction
Trioecy
 Androgyny
 Gonochorism
 Gynandromorph
 Self-pollination
 Self-fertilization
 Futanari
 Non-binary gender

References

Further reading 

 
 Discovery Health Channel, (2007) "I Am My Own Twin"
 
 
 
 , reprinted in:

External links 

 Britannica Online Encyclopedia: hermaphroditism (biology)
 Current Biology – Gender trading in a hermaphrodite
 The Evolution of Self-Fertile Hermaphroditism: The Fog Is Clearing
 "Born True Hermaphrodite – Pictorial Profile", about Lynn Edward Harris

Sexual reproduction
Reproductive system
Intersex in history
Supernumerary body parts